Pythian Temple may refer to:

Pythian Temple (Birmingham, Alabama), also known as Alabama Penny Savings Bank
 Pythian Temple (New York City)
 Pythian Temple and James Pythian Theater Columbus, Ohio
 Pythian Temple (Tacoma, Washington)

See also
List of Knights of Pythias buildings